The Financial Review Rich List 2019 is the 36th annual survey of the 200 wealthiest people resident in Australia, published by The Australian Financial Review on 31 May 2019. 

The net worth of the wealthiest individual, Anthony Pratt, was 15.77 billion; while the net worth of the 200th wealthiest individual, Patricia Ilhan, was 472 million; up from 387 million in 2018. The combined wealth of the 200 individuals was calculated as 342 billion; compared with a combined wealth of 6.4 billion in 1984 when the BRW Rich 200 commenced. Twenty-six women were included on the 2019 Rich List, representing 13 percent of the list; up from seventeen in 2018, or 8.5 percent. The list included seventeen debutants.

List of individuals 

{| class="wikitable"
!colspan="2"|Legend
|-
! Icon
! Description
|-
|
|Has not changed from the previous year's list
|-
|
|Has increased from the previous year's list
|-
|
|Has decreased from the previous year's list
|}

See also
 Financial Review Rich List
 Forbes Asia list of Australians by net worth

Notes

References

External links 

2019 in Australia
2019